Cloeon praetextum is a species of small minnow mayfly in the family Baetidae. It is found in Europe.

References

Mayflies
Articles created by Qbugbot
Insects described in 1914